Patrick Emanuel Martinus Lodiers (born October 25, 1971) is a Dutch television presenter and a former chairman of BNN.

Lodiers is the presenter of Dutch programs like De Lama's, Over Mijn Lijk and The Big Donor Show.

1971 births
Dutch game show hosts
Dutch public broadcasting administrators
Living people
People from Vlissingen